The Head of the Charles Regatta, also known as HOCR, is a rowing head race held on the penultimate complete weekend of October (i.e., on the Friday that falls between the 16th and the 22nd of the month, and on the Saturday and Sunday immediately afterwards) each year on the Charles River, which separates Boston and Cambridge, Massachusetts United States. It is the largest 3-day regatta in the world, with 11,000 athletes rowing in over 1,900 boats in 61 events. According to the Greater Boston Convention & Visitors Bureau, the three-day event brings 225,000 people to the Greater Boston area and $72 million to the local economy.

The last races of the Regatta are generally the most prestigious: Championship 4s, and Championship 8s (both men and women). Championship sculling events (1x/single and 2x/double) race on Saturday afternoon. The Championship events usually include U.S. National Team athletes, as well as national team athletes from other top rowing nations.

The competitive field includes individual and team competitors from colleges, high schools, and clubs from nearly all American states and various countries. The 2006 field included rowers from China, South Africa, Croatia, Ireland, and the Netherlands. The age of athletes spans from 14 to 85 years old with experience levels from novice to Olympic. In 2007, approximately 10% of the field was international.

Course
The course is three miles (4,800 meters) long and stretches from the start at Boston University's DeWolfe Boathouse near the Charles River Basin to the finish just after the Eliot Bridge and before Northeastern University's Henderson Boathouse. The course is renowned for being challenging for crews to navigate without incident or penalty. The course contains six bridges, which appear in this order from the start:

The Weeks and Eliot Bridges fall at sharp turns in the course, and collisions occur here more than any other part of the course.

Racing regulations
Crews start the race at 15-second intervals. The starting order is based on the crew's finishing time in the previous year, with the top finisher from the prior year leaving first, the second finisher leaving second, and so on. Crews that did not compete in the prior year are seeded after all prior year entrants in a random order, although race organizers have some discretion in the seeding process. Having presumably faster crews start ahead of presumably slower crews reduces the amount of passing boats must make during the race, reducing the potential for boating accidents. However, passing almost always occurs, and penalties are imposed on crews that do not follow passing regulations, such as failing to yield to a boat that closes to within one boat length of open water.

History

First year 
The Head of the Charles Regatta was first organized in 1965 by Cambridge Boat Club members D'Arcy MacMahon, Howard McIntyre, and Jack Vincent. The members of the boat club thought that a fall regatta would be an entertaining way to break up the monotony of the training season for colleges and boat clubs in the area. D'Arcy MacMahon had been the captain of the University of Pennsylvania's lightweight varsity three seasons earlier. They initially had little hope the regatta would be a success, it was the wrong time of year and it wasn't expected to draw any spectators.

Harvard University sculling instructor Ernest Arlett provided the idea for the head race. George Ernest Arlett came to the US because in England only "gentlemen" could race.  Even when Arlett brought Northeastern University's rowing team to Henley Royal Regatta and the team members were invited, the team entered by the front door and Mr. Arlett still had to enter by the rear or servants door. Class snobbery or pedigree was still in force.

Despite their reservations, the founders of the regatta were determined to see it become a success. In an interview with New York Times, Jerry Olrich and MacMahon identified that this regatta was "destined to become a classic"

The Regatta expanded to a two-day event in 1997.

In 1991, Frederick V. Schoch was appointed Executive Director of the Regatta, and he continues to oversee the event.

Charity program
Since 1998, the Head of the Charles Regatta's Charity Program has generated over $1,000,000 for its official charities, which include Cambridge Community Foundation and Community Rowing, Inc. The Charity Program allows competitors to gain an automatic entry into the Regatta in exchange for raising $1250 per person, per entry. Under official rules, any single, double, four, or eight is eligible to enter.

Cancellations
The race has been cancelled only twice: in 1996 due to storm bringing heavy rain and wind, and in 2020 due to the COVID-19 pandemic. (An online version in the fall of 2020 replaced the in-person race.)

Awards
First place medals are awarded to winning competitors in each event category of the race. The first place medals are struck bronze medallions that are 2.5 inches in diameter. They show a single sculler from above on the front, and are engraved with the year and event on the back. Only the first place medals are distributed at the Regatta on Saturday and Sunday evenings following the races. Medals for second and third place medallions are of the same design, but are 1.75 inches in diameter. The Regatta issues additional subordinate medals according to the number of entries in the race as well. 

1-9 Entries: up to 1st place awarded

10-19 Entries: up to 2nd place awarded

20-29 Entries: up to 3rd place awarded

30-39 Entries: up to 4th place awarded

40+ Entries: up to 5th place awarded

Special winner medals (2.5 inches in diameter) engraved (a) COLLEGE-CHAMPIONSHIP, (b) LIGHTWEIGHT, (c) CLUB, or (d) UNDER-17 shall be awarded respectively to (a) the fastest crew made up of undergraduates representing accredited/chartered Colleges or Universities in each event-division of the Championship 2x, Championship 4+ and Championship 8+, (b) the fastest Lightweight crew in the Championship 2x, (c) the fastest crew unaffiliated with an academic institution in each event-division of the Club 4+ and Club 8+, (d) the fastest U17 crew in the Youth Single, Youth Double, Youth Coxed Quad, Youth Four, and Youth Eight, and (e) the fastest JV entry in the Men’s and Women’s Championship Eight. 

Special medals are also issued to the most competitive Grand-Veteran scullers in the Senior-Veteran Singles Event; the fastest Veteran crews in the Senior-Master 2x, 4+, and 8+ events; the fastest Grand-Master crews in the Senior-Master 2x, 4+, and 8+ events.

Because of the 2020 cancellation caused by the global pandemic, the 2021 regatta awarded a special medal to the fastest Class of 2020 crew in the Alumni Four and Alumni Eight (crew must be at least 75% 2020 graduates, coxswain excluded).

Winners of special medals will not be awarded subordinate medals should they qualify. No special medal will be awarded if the first place medal winner also qualifies for a special medal.

Course records

Notes

External links
 Head of the Charles Regatta
 Row2k Head of the Charles coverage

Annual events in Boston
Annual sporting events in the United States
Charles River
Head races
Massachusetts culture
Rowing competitions in the United States
Sports competitions in Boston